On 7 August 2017, a truck bombing occurred at Band Road in Lahore, Punjab, Pakistan. Two people were killed and 35 others were wounded. Tehrik-i-Taliban Pakistan is suspected to have perpetrated the attack.

Background 
Lahore suffered several terrorist incidents in 2017. This attack came two weeks after a suicide bombing that claimed 26 lives, which followed a blast targeting a census team in April and a bombing that killed 13 people in February.

Intelligence before the attack 
According to a news article published in Daily Dunya on 1 August, law enforcement agencies had diligently informed the Inspector General of the Punjab Police, Arif Nawaz, about the details and specific locations of the highly possible terror attacks.

The agencies passed on information that there were several facilitators and groups of banned outfits near fruit markets who were actively transporting explosive materials, weapons, suicide jackets and timing devices via trucks and secretly occupying several buildings where they plan terror activities, the report stated.

Warning the police officials, the agencies said that the checkpoints near the fruit markets were not doing enough to ensure safety and security. The agencies directed them to carry out intelligence-based and combing operations in and around the target areas so that those who want to carry out the attacks in Punjab cannot do so easily.

Attack 
At around 20:50 UTC+5:00, a truck loaded with fruit exploded, killing two and injuring 35 people. Injuries were caused by debris of the building that collapsed as a result of explosion. More than 100 vehicles near the explosion were also damaged. The roof of a nearby school collapsed. The explosion caused damage to an electrical transformer and consequently the electrical supply was suspended and the area of the explosion was darkened. People initially thought that the electrical transformer had exploded. The explosion left a 10-foot crater on the ground. Parts of the truck were found several hundred meters away from the site of the explosion.

Aftermath 
As the explosion occurred about 300 meters away from Rescue 1122's headquarters, Rescue 1122 teams began to take the injured to Mian Munshi Hospital and Moyo Hospital. Security officials cordoned off the area. The bomb disposal squad reached the site and discovered that 80 kilograms of explosive material was used.

Following the attack, the Counter Terrorism Department (CTD) teams began their search operation. A few hours after the attack, a clash erupted between 7 terrorists and the CTD team in which 4 terrorists were shot dead while 3 others managed to flee in the dark. The terrorists were identified as Tehreek-i-Taliban Pakistan's militants.

Reactions 
CM Punjab Shehbaz Sharif condemned the attack and directed the authorities to investigate it.

References 

2017 murders in Pakistan
2017 in Punjab, Pakistan
2017 road incidents
2010s crimes in Lahore
2010s road incidents in Asia
Attacks on buildings and structures in 2017
Attacks on buildings and structures in Lahore
August 2017 crimes in Asia
Car and truck bombings in Pakistan
Improvised explosive device bombings in 2017 
Improvised explosive device bombings in Lahore
Murder in Lahore
Road incidents in Pakistan
Tehrik-i-Taliban Pakistan attacks
Terrorist incidents in Pakistan in 2017